Reza Ramezani (* 1963 in Rasht, Northern Iran) is a Twelver Shia Muslim cleric with the religious Rank Ayatollah. He has been a member of the Expert Council (Assembly of Experts) in the Islamic Republic of Iran since 2006. From 2009 to August 2018, he was head and director of the Islamic Center Hamburg, the center of Shiite Islam in Germany. Before working in Hamburg, he headed the Islamic Center Imam Ali Vienna. He is the Secretary-General of the Ahl Al-Bayt World Assembly and the representative of Gilan in the Assembly of Experts. Between 2001 and 2005, he represented the Supreme Leader and the Friday Imams in Karaj.

Life and Career 
Ramezani studied at the theological faculty in Rasht, later in Mashhad. His teachers include the Ayatollahs. In Qom he then studied Islamic Law and Postgraduate education (ijtihad) with the Ayatollah Mohammad Fazel Lankarani, Wahid Khorasani, Makarem shirazi, Ja'far Sobhani, Taqi Bahjat and Madadi Khorasani, furthermore the subjects exegesis, philosophy with the Ayatollah Hassanzadeh Amoli, Ansari Schirasi, Askari Gilani and Ahmad Beheschti. Then he did his doctorate. "He taught subjects such as Arabic literature, logic, philosophy, Islamic theology, ethics, exegesis, Islamic jurisprudence and canonical foundations at theological faculties in Rasht, Mashhad, Qom and Karaj, in all, including the higher levels,". Ramezani is the author of numerous articles and writings.

Literature 
Al-Fadschr No. 136 (The new director of the Islamic Center Hamburg; PDF; 106 kB) Editor: Islamic Center Hamburg.

See also 
 Zaynolabideen Ghorbani
 Encyclopaedia of Islam
 Seyed Abbas Hosseini Ghammaghami
 Islamic Centre Hamburg
 List of Ayatollahs
 List of members in the Fifth Term of the Council of Experts

References

External links/references
 Profile at the Assembly of Experts (majles khobregan)
 Tag Archives: Ayatollah Reza Ramezani Gilani. Ijtihadnet Network
 Reza Ramezani Gilani's personal website
 Board of Trustees, Ahl al-Bayt University

Iranian ayatollahs
People from Rasht
21st-century Iranian philosophers
Iranian writers
1963 births
Living people